The 1940 Penn Quakers football team was an American football team that represented the University of Pennsylvania as an independent during the 1940 college football season. In their third season under head coach George Munger, the Quakers compiled a 6–1–1 record, were ranked No. 14 in the final AP Poll, and outscored opponents by a total of 247 to 79. The team played its home games at Franklin Field in Philadelphia.

Schedule

References

Penn
Penn Quakers football seasons
Penn Quakers football